Hradivka  may refer to two places in Ukraine:

 Hradivka, Lviv Oblast, village in Horodok Raion, Lviv Oblast
 Hradivka, Mykolaiv Oblast, village in Veselynove Raion, Mykolaiv Oblast